Fred Graber was a professional rugby league footballer in the Australian competition, the New South Wales Rugby League. Graber played for the Eastern Suburbs club in the year 1956. He also played for the Western Suburbs club in 1958.

References
 The Eastern Suburbs Website

External links
Fred Graber at Rugby League Project
Fred Graber at Rugby League Tables

Living people
Australian rugby league players
Sydney Roosters players
Western Suburbs Magpies players
Year of birth missing (living people)
Place of birth missing (living people)